George Richard Shorter (17 June 1894 – 1968) was a British boxer. He competed in the men's lightweight event at the 1924 Summer Olympics.

Shorter won the 1921 and 1923 Amateur Boxing Association British lightweight titles, when boxing out of the Clapton Federation ABC.

References

External links
 

1894 births
1968 deaths
British male boxers
Olympic boxers of Great Britain
Boxers at the 1924 Summer Olympics
Boxers from Greater London
Lightweight boxers